Sikorki  is a village in the administrative district of Gmina Nowogard, within Goleniów County, West Pomeranian Voivodeship, in northwestern Poland. It is located on the Wołczenica river in the historic region of Pomerania.

References

Villages in Goleniów County